Nord 2.311 to 2.380, were 4-4-0T locomotives for suburban passenger traffic of the Chemins de Fer du Nord.
The machines were built in 1892–1893.
They were nicknamed "Ravachol" because of the entry into service of the series when the latter was arrested in April 1892.

History
The locomotives were put into service starting in 1892 to power services the Nord and Nord-Belge lines. They were numbered 2.311 to 2.380 by the Nord. 

The 70 locomotives were built by four companies: Société Alsacienne de Constructions Mécaniques, Société Franco-Belge, Fives-Lille, and Schneider et Cie.

At nationalisation on 1 January 1 1938, the survivors were renumbered 2-220.TA.1 to 2-220.TA.19 by the SNCF.

References

Bibliography

External links
 ETH-Bibliothek Zürich, Bildarchiv. Nord 2.342, viewer

Steam locomotives of France
2.311
4-4-0T locomotives
Railway locomotives introduced in 1892
SACM locomotives
Franco-Belge locomotives
Fives-Lille locomotives
Schneider locomotives

Passenger locomotives